Rita Mayfield is a Democratic member of the Illinois House of Representatives who has represented the 60th district since July 2010.

Early life and career
She has a Bachelor of Science degree from Columbia College in Computer Information Systems and a Master of Science from Benedictine University in Management and Organization Behavior with an Emphasis in Organization Development.

Illinois House of Representatives
On June 4, 2010, State Representative Eddie Washington died of a heart attack. On July 6, 2010, Mayfield was appointed by local Democratic leaders to succeed Washington to serve in the Illinois House of Representatives from the 60th district. The 60th district, at the time, included all or parts of Waukegan and North Chicago. During the 2011 decennial redistricting process, portions of Gurnee, Beach Park, and Park City were added to the 60th district.

As of July 3, 2022, Representative Mayfield is a member of the following Illinois House committees:

 Appropriations - Elementary & Secondary Education Committee (HAPE)
 Appropriations - Human Services Committee (HAPH)
 (Chairwoman of) Appropriations - Public Safety Committee (HAPP)
 Consumer Protection Committee (HCON)
 Elementary & Secondary Education: School Curriculum & Policies Committee (HELM)
 Energy & Environment Committee (HENG)
 Firefighters and First Responders Subcommittee (SHPF-FIRE)
 Insurance Committee (HINS)
 Law Enforcement Subcommittee (SHPF-LAWE)
 Police & Fire Committee (SHPF)
 (Chairwoman of) Product Safety Subcommittee (HCON-PROD)
 Small Business, Tech Innovation, and Entrepreneurship Committee (SBTE)
 (Co-chairwoman of) Special Issues (INS) Subcommittee (HINS-SPIS)

Electoral history

References

External links
Representative Rita Mayfield (D) 60th District at the Illinois General Assembly
By session: 98th, 97th, 96th
State Representative Rita Mayfield constituency site
 
Rep. Rita Mayfield District Website Official website
Rep. Rita Mayfield at Illinois House Democrats
Rita Mayfield Campaign Website Campaign website

Living people
People from Waukegan, Illinois
Benedictine University alumni
Columbia College Chicago alumni
Women state legislators in Illinois
Democratic Party members of the Illinois House of Representatives
Year of birth missing (living people)
21st-century American politicians
21st-century American women politicians